Monterey Park is a residential neighbourhood in the northeast quadrant of Calgary, Alberta. It is at the eastern edge of the city, bounded by McKnight Boulevard to the north, 68 Street E to the west, Trans-Canada Highway to the south and 84 Street E (city limits) to the east.

The land was annexed to the city of Calgary between 1979 and 1983, and Monterey Park was established in 1985. It was named for the city of Monterey Park, California, and the neighbourhood has a California theme (such as street names and building styles). It is represented in the Calgary City Council by the Ward 5 councillor.

The area's postal code is T1Y.

Demographics

Residents in this community had a median household income of $64,208 in 2000, and there were 9.9% low income residents living in the neighbourhood. As of 2000, 45.1% of the residents were immigrants. Most buildings were single-family detached homes, and 6.3% of the housing was used for renting.

Education
This neighbourhood has one public elementary school: Monterey Park Elementary School. (K-6)

See also
List of neighbourhoods in Calgary

References

External links
Monterey Park Community Association

Neighbourhoods in Calgary